The Mears Memorial Bridge is a truss bridge on the Alaska Railroad, completed in 1923.

History
The bridge's namesake, Colonel Frederick Mears, was chairman and chief engineer of the Alaska Engineering Commission, the railroad's builder and original operator.

The bridge was the final link in the railroad, entering service in February 1923, a year after the rest of the  line was finished. The AEC hired the Chicago firm of Ralph Modjeski and Angier to design the bridge, and the American Bridge Company to fabricate and erect it. When completed, this  Pennsylvania through-truss bridge was the longest truss span in the United States and its territories.

This bridge still ranks as the longest span of any kind in Alaska.  it was then the third-longest simple truss bridge in North America.

President Warren G. Harding, becoming the first president to visit Alaska, traveled to the state to drive the ceremonial last spike at the north end of the bridge on July 15, 1923. It was one of Harding's last public appearances, as he died 18 days later during his ongoing western tour.

See also
 Juneau–Douglas Bridge, next longest span in Alaska

References

External links
 Construction photos by designer Walter Angier
 Recent photos at Bridgehunter.com

1923 establishments in Alaska
Alaska Railroad
Bridges completed in 1923
Bridges in Unorganized Borough, Alaska
Buildings and structures in Yukon–Koyukuk Census Area, Alaska
Railroad bridges in Alaska
Steel bridges in the United States
Truss bridges in the United States
Pennsylvania truss bridges in the United States
Tanana Athabaskans